The Dublin Under 21 Hurling Championship is an annual Gaelic Athletic Association club competition between the under-21 hurlers of Dublin clubs. The current (2017) under 21 champions of Dublin are Na Fianna who beat Ballyboden St Enda's 2-17 to 2-14 at O'Toole Park on 25 November 2017.

2017 Under 21 Hurling Final

Roll of Honour

Under 21 B Championship

Under 21 C Hurling Championship

5